Catalpa is an unincorporated community in Holt County, Nebraska, United States.

History
A post office was established at Catalpa in the 1880s. It was named from a grove of Catalpa trees near the town site.

References

Unincorporated communities in Holt County, Nebraska
Unincorporated communities in Nebraska